This is a discography of Anathema, a Liverpool-based rock band. They released three albums through Peaceville Records before switching to Music For Nations in 1998. Since 2010 the band have been releasing material through K Scope.

Albums

Studio albums

Live albums

Compilation albums

Extended plays

Singles

Video albums

Music videos

References 

Alternative rock discographies
Heavy metal group discographies
Discographies of British artists